Rafał Pietrzak (born 30 January 1992) is a Polish professional footballer who plays as a defender for Lechia Gdańsk. Besides Poland, he has played in Belgium.

Career

Club
Pietrzak was born in Sosnowiec. In August 2010, he joined Górnik Zabrze on a one-year loan from Zagłębie Sosnowiec. In June 2011, he permanently signed with Górnik Zabrze.

In August 2011, he was loaned to Piast Gliwice on a one-year deal.

International
He was a part of Poland national under-19 football team.

Pietrzak received his first call up to the Poland national team in September 2018 for the UEFA Nations League game against Italy. He replaced Jakub Błaszczykowski in the 80th minute to earn his first cap in a 1–1 draw.

References

External links
 

1993 births
Living people
People from Sosnowiec
Sportspeople from Silesian Voivodeship
Association football midfielders
Polish footballers
Poland youth international footballers
Poland international footballers
Zagłębie Sosnowiec players
Górnik Zabrze players
Piast Gliwice players
Kolejarz Stróże players
GKS Katowice players
Wisła Kraków players
Royal Excel Mouscron players
Lechia Gdańsk players
Ekstraklasa players
Belgian Pro League players
Polish expatriate footballers
Expatriate footballers in Belgium
Zagłębie Lubin players